GMCA may refer to:

German Mosquito Control Association in Speyer
Greater Manchester Combined Authority